Pordenone (Venetian and ) is the main comune of Pordenone province of northeast Italy in the Friuli Venezia Giulia region.

The name comes from Latin Portus Naonis, meaning 'port on the Noncello (Latin Naon) River'.

History

Pordenone was created at the beginning of the High Middle Ages as a river port on the Noncello, with the name Portus Naonis. In the area, however, there were already villas and agricultural settlements from the Roman age, especially in the area of the town of Torre.

Between 1257 and 1270 Pordenone was conquered by Ottokar II of Bohemia, who was eventually defeated in 1277, when the city was brought back to the Empire, under Rodolph I of Habsburg.

In 1278, after having been administrated by several feudatories, the city was handed over to the Habsburg family, forming an Austrian enclave within the territory of the Patriarchal State of Friuli. In the 14th century, Pordenone grew substantially due to the flourishing river trades, gaining the status of city in December 1314.

In 1508, after the failed invasion of the Republic of Venice by Emperor Maximilian, the city was seized by Venice. Despite temporary Austrian occupation during the subsequent War of the League of Cambrai (1509–16), the Venetian sovereignty over Pordenone was confirmed in 1516. Until 1537, the town was ruled by the feudal family d'Alviano, as a reward for Bartolomeo d'Alviano's military service to the Republic.
Under Venice a new port was built and the manufacturers improved.

After the Napoleonic period, Pordenone was included in the Austrian possessions in Italy (Kingdom of Lombardy–Venetia). The railway connection, including Pordenone railway station (1855), and the construction of the Pontebbana road brought on the decline of the port, but spurred substantial industrial development (especially for the working of cotton). Pordenone was annexed to Italy in 1866.

The cotton sector decayed after the damage of World War I and failed completely after the 1929 crisis. After World War II, the local Zanussi firm became a world giant of household appliances, and in 1968, Pordenone became capital of the province with the same name, including territory belonging to Udine.

After World War II, Pordenone, as well as the rest of Friuli Venezia Giulia, became a garrison for many military units, in order to prevent a socialist Yugoslavian invasion from the east.

The heavy military presence boosted the economy of the once-depressed area.

Pordenone is as now garrison of the 132nd Armored Brigade "Ariete".

Geography
The territory of Pordenone is located in the lowlands of the Po-Venetian Valley, south of Venetian Alps and the Alpine foothills of Friuli.

The lowlands of Pordenone is characterized by an abundance of water and by the "phenomenon" of resurgence.

Climate
Climate in this area has mild differences between highs and lows, and there is adequate rainfall year-round. The Köppen Climate Classification subtype for this climate is "Cfa" (Humid Subtropical Climate).

Demographics

Local languages and dialects 
In ancient times, the Friulian language was spoken in Pordenone. Under the Venetian rule the Venetian language – closer to modern standard Italian – was subsequently introduced in a form which developed into the modern days Pordenone dialect. The town is surrounded by Friulian-speaking communities (though Venetian features can be found there as well).

However, Friulian is protected in town in accordance with the Regional Law of December 18, 2007, n. 29, "Norms for the protection, promotion and enhancement of the Friulian language".

Ethnic minorities 
Foreign citizens living in Pordenone amount to 7,025 persons, making 13.7% of the town population. The ten largest ethnic minorities are listed as follows:

 , 1,810
 , 931
 , 823
 , 346
 , 317
 , 268
 , 230
 , 229
 , 211
 , 137

Government

Economy

Landmarks

Religious buildings
 Cathedral of St. Mark (Duomo) was built from 1363 in Romanesque-Gothic style and restored in the 16th and 18th centuries. It houses a famous fresco of San Rocco and an altarpiece depicting the Virgin of Mercy by the native Renaissance painter Giovanni Antonio de' Sacchis (commonly known as Il Pordenone). Also inside the church are preserved the baptistery and the font by Giovanni Antonio Pilacorte, some fragments of frescoes of the circle of Gentile da Fabriano and a painting by Tintoretto. It has a  bell tower.
 Church of St. Mary of the Angels, also known as Church of the wooden Christ. The church was built in 1309 and it is characterized by an entrance portal in Istrian stone by Giovanni Antonio Pilacorte. Inside the sacred building they are kept a crucifix dating from the 1466 of Johannes Teutonicus and remains of a cycle of fourteenth-century frescoes. They are worthy of mention: the Saint Barbara by Gianfrancesco da Tolmezzo and the Our Lady of Sorrows, fresco from the first half of the fourteenth century. On the left wall of the church it is possible to admire a Madonna of humility(fourteenth-century fresco of the school of Vitale da Bologna)
 Parish Church of San George. Neoclassical church, characterized by the nineteenth-century bell tower, column Doric (architect Giovanni Battista Bassi).
 The church of the Santissima Trinità ("Holy Trinity"), alongside the Noncello river. It has an octagonal plant and frescoes by Giovanni Maria Calderari, pupil of Il Pordenone.
 Church of Blessed Odoric of Pordenone, built by architect Mario Botta in 1990–1992.
 Church of S. Ulderico, located in Villanova suburb. Contains frescoes by Il Pordenone and the font and baptistery are by Giovanni Antonio Pilacorte.
 Parish Church of St. Lawrence Martyr, in the frazione of Roraigrande, contains the baptismal font of Renaissance sculptors Donato and Alvise Casella. Inside it is possible to admire a cycle of frescoes by Giovanni Antonio de 'Sacchis'.

Secular buildings
The town has many mansions and palaces, in particular along the ancient "Greater Contrada", today Corso Vittorio Emanuele II (wonderful example of Venetian porticoes and called by some small "waterless Grand Canal"). Below is a list of the most important in terms of architectural and artistic.
 The Gothic Communal Palace (1291–1395). The clock-tower of the loggia, designed by painter Pomponio Amalteo, was added in the 16th century to the main building.
 Palazzo Ricchieri: Built in the 13th century as a house fortress with a tower, it was rebuilt to house the Ricchieri family. It now houses the Civic Art Museum.
 Palazzo Polacco – Barbarich – Scaramuzza.

 Palazzo Rorario – Spelladi – Silvestri, headquarters of the municipal gallery "Harry Bertoia".
 Palazzo Mantica – Cattaneo.
 Palazzo Mantica.
 Palazzo Gregoris.
 Casa Gregoris – Bassani.
 Palazzo Varmo – Pomo, also known as House of the Captains.
 Palazzo Crescendolo – Milani.
 Palazzo Popaite – Torriani – Policreti.
 Casa Simoni.
 Casa Pittini.
 Palazzo Domenichini – Varaschini.
 Palazzo Rosittis.
 Palazzo De Rubeis.

Castles
 Castello di Torre (late 12th century), residence of the Ragogna family and now seat of the Western Friuli Archaeological Museum. It was assaulted in 1402 by Imperial troops, who destroyed the castle. A few years later a tower was rebuilt.
 Castle of the ancient town of Pordenone, located in Piazza della Motta, now a prison.

Archaeological site
 Roman Villa of Torre, remains of a patrician villa discovered in the 1950s.

Venetian villas
In the city there are nine buildings protected by the Regional Institute Venetian Villas (IRVV). Worthy of note are:
 Villa Cattaneo, the Gaspera, (seventeenth century), which is characterized by a high arched pediment (Villanova of Pordenone);
 Villa Cattaneo, Cirielli Barbini, probably dating back to 700 (Vallenoncello of Pordenone).

Industrial archeology
The urban conglomerate of Pordenone is characterized by the presence of the ruins of the industries dating back to the nineteenth century, examples of industrial archeology.

Transport

Road
The main roads serving Pordenone are the Autostrada A28 and the Strada statale 13 Pontebbana (SS13).

Bus
The local transportation company in Pordenone is called ATAP. It provides ten "urban routes", which serve the municipal territory and all surrounding neighborhoods, and several "extraurban routes" which cover the whole Pordenone province, about twenty of them connecting the town directly with other destinations, including Aviano, the Venice International Airport and Lignano.

Railway
Pordenone railway station, opened in 1855, is located on the Venice–Udine railway. Although it is not a junction or terminal station, it is used by 3 million passengers a year.

Air

Education
As concerns public general education, Pordenone hosts nine kindergartens, twelve primary schools, four first grade secondary schools, the Flora Professional School of Commerce, Culinary Studies, Hospitality Training and Social Services, the Zanussi Professional School of Industry and Crafts, the Matiussi High School of Economics, two Schools of Technologies (J.F. Kennedy and Pertini). The "licei" (grammar schools) in town are Grigoletti Scientific High School and Leopardi-Majorana High School of Classics and Science. Alongside public schools, some private schools also exist in Pordenone.

Pordenone hosts a local branch of the University of Trieste, whose didactic includes a double degree Master study program in Production Engineering and Management with the University of Lippe, Germany. Other curricula include B.Sc. courses in Multimedial Sciences & Technologies and Nursing and a M.Sc. course in Multimedia Communication and IT, offered by the University of Udine.

The university building on Via Prasecco was designed by Japanese architect Toyo Ito.

Sport
Pordenone is home to the Ottavio Bottecchia Stadium, on via dello Stadio, a multipurpose 3,000-seats facility once serving as a soccer field for the local team, Pordenone Calcio which is now playing at Stadio Teghil, stadium of the city of Lignano, and still as velodrome used for both national and international track cycling competitions. In 2001, the facility hosted one round of the UCI Track Cycling World Cup. It is considered one of the most important outdoor velodromes in the world.

The site of the stadium includes tennis courts as well as an athletics field.

Birthplace of accomplished NBA player Reggie Jackson.

Culture

Literature
Pordenone has hosted every year for more than a decade the book festival pordenonelegge.it, which includes book stalls being placed all over the town center as well as interviews with Italian and international authors and lectures by journalists and scholars.

Film 
Pordenone has been the primary host to the Giornate del cinema muto, a festival of silent film, since 1981, excepting an eight-year lapse after the host theater, Cinema-Teatro Verdi, was being demolished and rebuilt. The nearby town of Sacile hosted the festival from 1999 to 2006.

Pordenone is also home to the FMK International Short Film Festival.

Theatre

Music
In the 1980s, Pordenone was the hub of the Italian punk rock scene.

Punk-rock band Prozac+ and alternative rock band Tre Allegri Ragazzi Morti were formed in the 1990s in Pordenone. And in 2005 the Reggae band Mellow Mood was formed in Pordenone.

Since 1991, the town has hosted each summer the Pordenone Blues Festival, expanding its scope in 2010 encompassing the fields of performing arts, literature and visual arts. Notable guests over the years include Kool & the Gang, Steve Hackett, Rival Sons, Anastacia, Ronnie Jones and Ana Popović. Performers playing at this festival include artists based in Italy, Germany, Slovenia, Spain, Serbia, Croatia, Hungary and other countries.

Museums and galleries

Diocesan Museum of Sacred Art – Diocese of Concordia-Pordenone
Located in the Pastoral Activities Centre, designed by Othmar Barth (1988), retains a remarkable artistic heritage from churches and religious buildings of the Roman Catholic Diocese of Concordia-Pordenone.

Town Art Museum
The museum is housed in the Palazzo Ricchieri, an important place to understand the art of Veneto and Friuli Venezia Giulia. In it houses works by various painters, such as Pordenone, P. Amalteo, Varotari, Pietro della Vecchia, O. Politi and Michelangelo Grigoletti.

Civic Museum of Natural History Silvia Zenari

Archaeological Museum of Western Friuli
The museum, housed since 2006 in the ancient castle of the Torre of Pordenone, the last residence of Count Giuseppe di Ragogna, illustrates the archaeological heritage of the Province of Pordenone. Of particular significance are the finds from the caves Pradis and pile-dwelling (or stilt house) of Palù di Livenza (UNESCO World Heritage Site – Prehistoric pile dwellings around the Alps).

Gallery of Modern and Contemporary Art "Armando Pizzinato"
The museum is housed in a Venetian villa of the city park, once owned by industrialist Galvani. In its rooms it houses paintings by Mario Sironi, Renato Guttuso, Corrado Cagli, Alberto Savinio, Filippo de Pisis, Giuseppe Zigaina, Armando Pizzinato and many others.

Science Centre Scientific Imaginary of Torre

Gallery Sagittaria – Cultural Center House Antonio Zanussi

Newspapers
Two Italian daily newspapers have a local edition:
 Messaggero Veneto - Giornale del Friuli
 Il Gazzettino

Radio

Television

International relations

Twin towns — sister cities
Pordenone is twinned with:
  Spittal an der Drau, Austria, since 1987
  San Martín, Argentina, since 2003
  Irkutsk, Russia, since 2005
  Ōkawa, Japan

Notable people

 Odoric of Pordenone (1286–1331), an Italian late-medieval Franciscan friar and missionary explorer.
 Giovanni Francesco Fortunio (Pordenone, ca.1465 – 1517), author of the first grammar of 14C. Italian 
 Il Pordenone (ca.1484–1539), byname of Giovanni Antonio de’ Sacchis, an Italian mannerist painter
 Hieronymus Rorarius (Pordenone 1485-1556), envoy for Charles V of Habsburg, and a Papal nuncio 
 Giovanni Maria Zaffoni (ca.1500 – after 1570), an Italian painter of the Renaissance period
 Pomponio Amalteo (1505–1588), an Italian painter of the Venetian school.
 Donato Casella (ca.1505 ca. 1560) , Renaissance sculptor.
 Gaspare Narvesa (Pordenone 1558 – Spilimbergo, 1639), a local painter
 Giovanni Battista Bassi (Pordenone 1792 – Santa Margherita del Gruagno 1879)
 Girolamo Michelangelo Grigoletti  (1801–1870), an Italian painter, active in a Neoclassical style.
 Pietro Cesari (Pordenone 1849 – Milan 1922), opera singer
 Giovanni Battista Cossetti (1863–1955), musician and composer
 Rudy Buttignol (born 1951), a Canadian television network executive and entrepreneur.
 Davide Toffolo (born 1965, Pordenone), author of comics books
 Raffaello D’Andrea (born 1967), robotics engineer

Sport 
 Stefano Lombardi (born 1976 in Pordenone), an Italian footballer
 Luca Rossetti (born 1976), an Italian rally driver.
 Marzia Caravelli (born 1981), Italian hurdler, represented Italy at two Olympics.
 Daniele Molmentii (born 1984 in Pordenone), an Italian slalom canoeist
 Federico Gerardi (born 1987), an Italian footballer
 Reggie Jackson (born 1990), an American professional basketball player
 Alessia Trost (born 1993), an Italian female Olympic high jumper.
 Ivan Provedel (born 1994), a professional football goalkeeper

References

External links
 Official website 
 Town Art Museum 
 Western Friuli Archaeological Museum 
 Town Science Museum 
 Castello di Torre

 
Cities and towns in Friuli-Venezia Giulia
Corpus separatum